Baggio: The Divine Ponytail is a 2021 biographical sports film directed by Letizia Lamartire, written by Ludovica Rampoldi and Stefano Sardo and starring Andrea Arcangeli, Valentina Bellè and Thomas Trabacchi. It is based on real life events of Italian footballer Roberto Baggio. Netflix released the film for streaming on 26 May 2021.

Synopsis
A chronicle of the 22-year career of football star Roberto Baggio (Andrea Arcangeli), that includes his relationship with family members, his turbulent debut as a player and differences with some of his coaches, between successes, injuries, and his discovery of Nichiren Buddhism as practiced with the Soka Gakkai International.

Cast

 Andrea Arcangeli as Roberto Baggio
 Valentina Bellè as Andreina
 Thomas Trabacchi as Vittorio Petrone
 Andrea Pennacchi as Florindo
 Anna Ferruzzo as Matilde Baggio
 Simone Colombari as Fiorentina manager
 Antonio Zavatteri as Arrigo Sacchi
 Martufello as Carlo Mazzone
 Beppe Rosso as Giovanni Trapattoni
 Marc Clotet as Josep "Pep" Guardiola
 Daisaku Ikeda (archival)
 Roberto Baggio (archival)
 Paolo Maldini (archival)

Release
Netflix released the film for streaming on 26 May 2021.

Reception
On review aggregator website Rotten Tomatoes, the film holds an approval rating of 60% based on 5 reviews, with a weighted average rating of 4.9/10. Ben Kenigsberg of The New York Times wrote, "In real-life clips during the credits, an announcer calls him 'probably the most beloved player in Italian football.' It's a measure of how muddled the movie is that it never conveys how or why he became beloved. Even the soccer is perfunctory. Instead of lingering on the pitch, the director, Letizia Lamartire, cuts to Baggio’s friends and family watching on TV. Chronologically malapportioned, the film races through key developments, such as Baggio’s recovery from an injury or commitment to Buddhist meditation, and more than once abruptly flashes forward several years."

References

External links
 
 
 

2020s sports films
2021 films
Biographical films about sportspeople
Films about Buddhism
Italian association football films
2020s Italian-language films
Italian biographical films
Italian-language Netflix original films
Soka Gakkai